The English Fantail is a highly developed breed of fancy pigeon. The Fantail, along with other varieties of domesticated pigeons, are all descendants of the rock dove (Columba livia). The Fantail is said to have originated in India, but there are early references to it in Spain and China.

See also 

Fantail (pigeon)
List of pigeon breeds

References

Pigeon breeds
Pigeon breeds originating in England